Jim Reed may refer to:

 Jim Reed (coach) (1903–1994), American soccer coach
 Jim Reed (journalist) (1938–2011), Canadian journalist and news anchor
 Jim Reed (outlaw) (1845–1874), American outlaw
 Jim Reed (racing driver) (1926–2019), American racecar driver
 Jim Reed (academic) (born 1937), scholar of German literature
 Jim Reed, a police officer in Adam-12 portrayed by Kent McCord

See also
Jimmy Reed
Jim Read (disambiguation)
Jim Reid (disambiguation)
James Reed (disambiguation)